DeVita or De Vita is a surname of Italian origin. It may refer to:

 Elizabeth DeVita-Raeburn, American author and journalist
 Franco De Vita, Venezuelan singer
 Rob DeVita (born 1965), American football player
 Ted DeVita (1962–1980), victim of anemia
 Vincent T. DeVita, American physician in oncology
 DeVita (singer), Korean-American singer-songwriter